Alfaroa mexicana is a species of plant in the family Juglandaceae. It is endemic to Mexico.

References

mexicana
Endemic flora of Mexico
Trees of Mexico
Taxonomy articles created by Polbot
Plants described in 1968